Chrysocoris stollii is a polyphagous species of jewel bugs (Scutelleridae) common in continental Southeast Asia.

Description
General colour of dorsum metallic blue, green, or purple; abdominal venter yellow, broadly margined with purple laterad to spiracles, spiracles II–VII each surrounded by a rounded black spot; pro-, meso- and metepimeroids together with the supracoxal lobes yellow; coxae and trochanters pale yellow, femora with an apical annulus and longitudinal bands black, tibiae and tarsi black.

Bionomics
These insects feed on plant juices from a variety of different species, including some commercial crops such as Pigeon pea, Pongamia, Arecanut, Jatropha etc.

Distribution
One of the most common and abundant scutellerid in continental Southeast Asia. It is distributed all over Indochina and through the Sub-Himalayan Belt it extends up to Pakistan. Verified records are available from Bangladesh, Cambodia, China, India, Malaysia, Myanmar, Pakistan, Taiwan, Thailand, Vietnam; literature records from Korea, Sri Lanka, the Philippines and Indonesia are erroneous.

References

External links 

Scutelleridae
Insects described in 1801